The Marion Cubs were an Ohio State League (1947) and Ohio–Indiana League (1948) baseball team based in Marion, Ohio, USA. They were affiliated with the Chicago Cubs and played their home games at Lincoln Park.

References

Baseball teams established in 1947
Defunct minor league baseball teams
Defunct baseball teams in Ohio
1947 establishments in Ohio
1948 disestablishments in Ohio
Baseball teams disestablished in 1948
Ohio-Indiana League teams